Transparency, transparence or transparent most often refer to:

 Transparency (optics), the physical property of allowing the transmission of light through a material

They may also refer to:

Literal uses
 Transparency (photography), a still, positive image created on a transparent base using photochemical means
 Transparency (projection), a thin sheet of transparent material for use with an overhead projector
 Electromagnetically induced transparency, an effect in which a medium that is normally opaque is caused to become temporarily transparent
 Pentimento, an alteration in a painting, often revealed with growing transparency in paints with age

Animals and plants
 Transparent goby, a fish species of the family Gobiidae
 White Transparent, a cultivar of apple which is usually used for cooking due to its sharp taste

Arts, entertainment, and media

Music

Groups and labels
 Transparency (record label), a North American music publisher
 Transparent (band), a rock band from upstate New York

Albums
 Transparency (album), a 1985 album by the Herb Robertson Quintet
 Transparent (Coil album), 1984
 Transparent (LaRue album), 2001
 Transparente (album), 2005 album by Mariza
 Transparence, 2007 album by Markize

Songs
 "Transparency", a song by PartyNextDoor from the 2016 album PartyNextDoor 3
 "Transparent", a song by Suzi Quatro from her album Main Attraction
 "Transparent", a song by In Flames from the album Reroute to Remain

Other uses in arts, entertainment, and media
 Transparent (book), a book by Cris Beam
 Transparent (film), a 2005 documentary film
 Transparent (TV series), an American television series

Computing and mathematics
 Transparency (data compression), the ideal result of lossy data compression
 Transparency (human–computer interaction), a change to a computer system that adheres to previous external interface as much as possible
 Transparency (telecommunication), the property by which a transmission system passes a signal through without changing its form or content
 Network transparency, the ability of a protocol to transmit data over the network invisibly to those using the applications that are using the protocol
 Transparency, the property of a latch to show input changes immediately on output
 Alpha compositing, the process of combining an image with a background
 Image masks in computer graphics
 Transparency (graphic) in image formats, for overlay and translucency
 Transparency (pseudo), or background translucency in the X or X11 Window System
 Location transparency, making the names used to identify network resources independent of both the user's location and the resource location
 Order-independent transparency in 3D computer graphics
 Referential transparency, designating a deterministic function
 Security through transparency, a security engineering methodology

Humanities and business
 Transparency (behavior), a metaphor implying visibility in contexts related to the behavior of individuals or groups
 Transparency in government, see open government
 Transparency (linguistic), rhetoric to suit the widest possible audience without losing relevant information
 Transparency (market), in economics one of the theoretical conditions required for a free market to be efficient
 Transparency (philosophy), a metaphor applied to a state in which the subject can be aware of being in that state
 Transparency (science), research conducted in the spirit of free and open source software
 Transparency (trade), a principle stipulating that a country's regulations affecting foreign trade should be clearly communicated
 Compensation transparency, disclosure of wages, salaries, and other renumeration
 Media transparency, in the communications industry determining how and why information is conveyed through various means
 Radical transparency in management actions and approaches that radically increase openness

Organizations
 Transparency (Guatemala), a political party in Guatemala (Transparencia) secuetran racto hoy   24/07/2021 atodo los de autoridad guatemala y mexico y en calle y trabajo  los cosen en orno de panaderia depredador hoy racto encener nave gigante mundial entodo el tierro y universo  y ponerlos en alado deesapacio y  a aentarlos alo policias y familiares con lectura de mente vista x ideo orden marcos angel carmona cazarez y pais entero 
 Transparency International, an organization working for governance, corporate, banking and association transparency

Other uses
 Transparency (wine), ability of a wine to portray all unique aspects of its flavor

See also
 Clarity (disambiguation)
 Visibility (disambiguation)